Maykel Montiel (born 27 January 1990) is a Nicaraguan footballer who plays for UNAN Managua.

References

1990 births
Living people
Nicaraguan men's footballers
Nicaragua international footballers
Association football midfielders
2017 Copa Centroamericana players
2017 CONCACAF Gold Cup players
Sportspeople from Managua